The Golden Valley line is the popular name given to the railway line between  and  and  in England.

The line was originally built as the Cheltenham and Great Western Union Railway in the 1840s. It was opened between Swindon and Kemble, along with a branch line to Cirencester, in 1841.  It was a further four years before the remainder of the line, including the tunnel at Sapperton, was completed.

The line diverges from the Great Western Main Line at Swindon.

Origin of name
The "Golden Valley" is the name given to part of the valley of the River Frome between Chalford and Stroud, which the railway line follows for part of its route. It is said that the name was coined by Queen Alexandra, wife of King Edward VII, while travelling on a train along the route in June 1909. The name has since become associated with the entire line from Swindon to Gloucester and Cheltenham, as these are the extents of the shortest train services along the line.

Places served
The towns served by the route are:
Swindon
Kemble
Stroud
Stonehouse
Gloucester (through trains must reverse, or omit calling here)
Cheltenham

The other intermediate stations and halts were closed to passengers on 2 November 1964. Kemble station was a junction for two branch lines, serving Cirencester and Tetbury; both branches closed to passengers on 6 April 1964.

Train services
Services are approximately hourly. The maximum speed on the line is 100 mph (160 km/h).

Electrification proposal
In 1977, the Parliamentary Select Committee on Nationalised Industries recommended considering electrification of more of Britain's rail network and, by 1979, BR presented a range of options to do so by 2000. Options included electrifying numerous former Great Western routes, including the Golden Valley line. Under the 1979–90 Conservative governments that succeeded the 1976–79 Labour government, the proposal was not implemented. , there are no plans to electrify the line.

Reinstatement of second track

The line had originally been built as double track, but as a cost saving measure it was reduced to single track between Swindon and Kemble in 1968. It was intended that the whole of the line between Swindon and Standish Junction would be single track, with passing places at Kemble and Sapperton, but protests caused British Rail to abandon the project after reaching Kemble.

Network Rail proposed to reinstate the second track in September 2008, then September 2009, but the plans were referred to the Office of Rail Regulation. Despite protests by local MPs, the ORR made a preliminary decision that the project would not be included in the 2009–2014 High Level Output Specification plan for new rail infrastructure. In the 2011 Budget the Government announced that funding for the redoubling was to be provided, with works reported to be completed by Spring 2014 and then delayed until August 2014.

Initial work involved slewing the single track, as it had been moved to the centre of the trackbed during the singling works. This was followed by excavation and clearance work, then finally installation of the new track. Level crossing works were also undertaken. The line was officially reopened by Anne, Princess Royal in October 2014.

See also
 Cheltenham and Great Western Union Railway – fuller details of the earlier stations on this line
 Thames and Severn Canal – runs alongside the line and can be seen from the train, particularly between Stroud and Kemble.

References

Sources

Rail transport in Gloucestershire
Rail transport in Wiltshire
Railway lines in South West England